Chandler Williams III (August 9, 1985 – January 5, 2013) was an American football wide receiver who last played as a member of the Tampa Bay Storm. He was drafted by the Minnesota Vikings in the seventh round of the 2007 NFL Draft. He played college football at Florida International.

Williams was also a member of the Miami Dolphins, Atlanta Falcons, and Kansas City Chiefs of the National Football League (NFL) as well as the Toronto Argonauts of the Canadian Football League (CFL).

College career
Williams played four years at FIU and left as one of the most prolific receivers in school history. Williams was Florida International's career leader in receptions with 203 receptions until T. Y. Hilton caught 229 receptions in his four-year career. Williams places 3rd on FIU's career leaderboard with 2,519 career yards and 6th with 8 career touchdowns. Williams also returned punts in college.

In his senior season, he ranked ninth nationally in receptions per game and first in the Sun Belt Conference. Williams also led the conference in yards per game averaging 66.4 yards per game.

Professional career

Minnesota Vikings
Williams was selected in the seventh round (233rd overall selection) of the 2007 NFL Draft by the Vikings. Williams was the second player in Florida International's history to be selected in the NFL Draft. (Antwan Barnes was picked in the fourth round by the Baltimore Ravens). Williams was the second of the Vikings' eight draft picks to sign a contract on May 30, 2007. He was cut by the Vikings after training camp in 2007.

Miami Dolphins
Williams was later signed to the practice squad of the Miami Dolphins, where he spent the entire season. He was re-signed in the 2008 offseason, but was waived on April 25.

Atlanta Falcons
Williams was signed by the Falcons on April 29, 2008. He was released by the Falcons during final cuts on August 30. On November 11, the Falcons re-signed him to their practice squad.

After spending the entire 2008 season on the practice squad, Williams was re-signed to a future contract on January 5, 2009. He was waived on September 4.

Kansas City Chiefs
Williams was signed to the Kansas City Chiefs' practice squad on December 23, 2009. After his contract expired following the season, he was re-signed to a future contract on January 4, 2010. He was cut by the Chiefs on May 6, 2010.

He was later re-signed and waived again on August 29, 2011.

Toronto Argonauts
On June 6, 2012, Williams signed with the Toronto Argonauts of the Canadian Football League. He was released by the Argonauts on October 4, 2012.  During his stint with the Argonauts, Williams recorded 4 receptions for 88 yards, his longest reception for 55 yards.

Personal life
Williams was married to Vanitia Harrigan. They had a daughter together, Tori Summer-Rose Williams.

Death
Williams died on January 5, 2013, of a suspected heart related condition while participating in a flag football tournament in Miami.  He was 27.

References

External links
FIU Panthers bio
Kansas City Chiefs bio
Tampa Bay Storm bio

1985 births
2013 deaths
Miami Senior High School alumni
Players of American football from Miami
American football wide receivers
FIU Panthers football players
Minnesota Vikings players
Miami Dolphins players
Atlanta Falcons players
Kansas City Chiefs players
Tampa Bay Storm players
Toronto Argonauts players
Players of Canadian football from Miami
Sports deaths in Florida